Dying Alive is a two-disc live album by German thrash metal band Kreator. Released in 2013 by Nuclear Blast, it contains 24 tracks recorded at Turbinehalle in Oberhausen. It was also released as a deluxe edition containing the two-CD set and a DVD.

Track listing

Personnel
Kreator
 Mille Petrozza – vocals, rhythm guitar
 Sami Yli-Sirniö – lead guitar
 Christian Giesler – bass
 Jürgen Reil – drums

Technical personnel
 Mille Petrozza – production
 Dominic Paraskevopoulos – sound production, recording
 Tim Neumann – sound production, recording
 Jens Bogren – mixing, mastering
 Tony Lindgren – mixing, mastering
 Jan Meininghaus – graphics, cover art

Chart positions

References

Kreator albums
2013 live albums
Live thrash metal albums